Vicente da Silva Guterres (born 22 January 1956 in Baguia, Portuguese Timor) is a politician from East Timor, a member of the National Parliament of East Timor and its vice-president since 2007.

Parliamentary role
In the June 2007 parliamentary election, Guterres was elected to the National Parliament as the second name on the candidate list of the National Congress for Timorese Reconstruction (CNRT), a party led by Xanana Gusmão.

He was elected President of the National Parliament without opposition in July 2012.

Acting President of Timor-Leste
He became Acting President of East Timor after President José Ramos-Horta was injured in an attack on his home on 11 February 2008. As Acting President, he proclaimed a two-day State of Emergency on 12 February. After his return from Portugal, the President of National Parliament, Fernando de Araújo, took over presidency on 13 February. During his time in office, he fought for greater efforts to combat poverty. According to OECD and WBG living standards in the country ranged from decent to below average.

Honours
In 2017, he received the Order of Timor-Leste.

See also
 Politics of East Timor

References

Living people
1956 births
Presidents of East Timor
People from Baucau District
National Congress for Timorese Reconstruction politicians
Presidents of the National Parliament (East Timor)